Chaudière-Appalaches is an administrative region in Quebec, Canada. It comprises most of what is historically known as the "Beauce" (compare with the electoral district of Beauce). It is named for the Chaudière River and the Appalachian Mountains.

The main cities are Lévis, Saint-Georges, Thetford Mines, Sainte-Marie and Montmagny.

Administrative divisions

Regional county municipalities

Equivalent territory

Major communities
Beauceville
L'Islet
Lac-Etchemin
Lévis
Montmagny
Saint-Agapit
Saint-AnselmeSaint-Apollinaire
Saint-Georges
Saint-Henri
Saint-Joseph-de-Beauce
Saint-Lambert-de-Lauzon
Sainte-Marie
Thetford Mines

Landmarks
See: List of historic places in Chaudière-Appalaches

References

External links

Portail régional de la Chaudière-Appalaches
Tourisme Chaudière-Appalaches
CRÉ

 
Administrative regions of Quebec